Abt is an occupational surname of Dutch and German origin derived from the clerical title of abbot. Notable people with the surname include:

Arts and entertainment
 Franz Abt (1819–1885), German composer
 Karl Friedrich Abt (1733–1783), German actor

Politicians
 John Abt (1904–1991), American CPUSA lawyer and New Deal politician
 Paul W. Abt (1845–1920), American businessman and politician

Science, engineering and research
 Carl Roman Abt (1850–1933), Swiss mechanical engineer who invented the Abt rack system for rack railways
 Clark C. Abt (born 1929), American game researcher
 Thomas Abt (born 1972), American policy analyst

 Helmut Abt (born 1925), American astrophysicist

Sport
 Alexander Abt (born 1976), Russian figure skater and coach
 Christian Abt (born 1967), German racing driver
 Daniel Abt (born 1992), German racing driver
 Gudrun Abt (born 1962), German athlete
 Hans-Jürgen Abt, German race team manager

See also

Ant (name)

References 

German-language surnames